Grant Macaskill is a Scottish New Testament scholar and Kirby Laing Chair of New Testament Exegesis at the University of Aberdeen.

Career 
Macaskill was appointed to the Kirby Laing Chair of New Testament Exegesis in 2015. Prior to this, he had taught as senior lecturer in New Testament at the University of St Andrews, where he had completed both his doctoral and postdoctoral projects. His research engages with the New Testament as a coherent body of theological literature emerging from the diverse contexts of late Second Temple Judaism. His publications have included extensive treatments of theological issues in the New Testament, notably 'Union with Christ', and detailed examination of the transmission of Jewish apocalyptic texts in Christian tradition, particularly 1 Enoch and 2 Enoch. He is completing a study of 'The New Testament and Intellectual Humility', funded by Saint Louis University and the John Templeton Foundation, and is beginning an examination of 'The Ascension of Christ', co-authored with David Moffitt (University of St Andrews). He is also contracted to write a 2-volume theological commentary on Romans for the International Theological Commentary Series (T&T Clark).

Prior to his theological studies Macaskill studied General Science at the University of Glasgow.

References 

Living people
Scottish Christian theologians
21st-century British theologians
Year of birth missing (living people)